MV Leinster was a passenger ferry operated across the Irish Sea between 1937 and 1966. She was renamed Ulster Prince to replace the 1929 motorship of that name, lost during WWII.

History
MV Leinster was a passenger ship built by Harland and Wolff for the British and Irish Steam Packet Company in 1937. She was initially chartered to Belfast Steamship Company for the Belfast - Liverpool service, until a new terminal was completed at Dublin. Leinster and her sister  took up their intended service between Liverpool and Dublin in 1938. They were the largest vessels in the Coast Lines fleet and were to prove too large for that route. Their original buff hulls were later changed to dark green. The new ferries did not have capacity for cattle, an important cargo on the Dublin route. Two cattle carriers were built in 1937: Kilkenny (1,320 tons from the Liffey Dockyard), and Dundalk (630 tons from Ardrossan, Scotland).

Shortly after the outbreak of World War II, the B&I ships were removed from their normal routes. Leinster was converted into a hospital ship and then a troop carrier.

In 1966, she was renamed Ulster Prince I to make way for her replacement .

In 1967, she was sold to Epirotiki Line, renamed Odysseus. By 1976, she was used as accommodation at Kyle of Lochalsh, and later at Glasgow. She was scrapped at Faslane in 1980.

Service
Liverpool - Belfast (1937)
Liverpool - Dublin (1937–46)
Liverpool - Belfast (1946–66)

References

Ferries of the United Kingdom
1937 ships
Ships built by Harland and Wolff